The Sun Star is the student newspaper of the University of Alaska Fairbanks, formed in a merger of the Northern Sun and the Polar Star. The newspaper has been the recipient of journalism awards from the Alaska Press Club, the Columbia Scholastic Press Association, and other groups in past years.

In addition to news, advertisements for local companies and event listings, the Sun Star website gives the public the ability to access financial information regarding University of Alaska (including UAA, UAS and UAF) employees. In April 2018, The Sun Star transitioned from print to digital-only editions.

References

External links

The Sun Star digital archive (2009–2017)

Mass media in Fairbanks, Alaska
Student newspapers published in Alaska
University of Alaska Fairbanks